Universal's Halloween Horror Nights (originally Universal Studios Fright Nights in 1991) is an annual Halloween-themed event at Universal Studios theme parks in Orlando, Hollywood, Japan and Singapore. The event was originally named Universal Studios Fright Nights in 1991 and began as a 3-night event at Universal Studios Florida. The following year, it re-branded as Halloween Horror Nights, advertised as the "second annual event". Since then, it evolved into a scare-a-thon event filled with themed haunted houses and scare zones, over the course of select nights from early September until late October/early November.

The event was held at Universal Studios Florida from 1991 until 2001, when Halloween Horror Nights moved to Universal's Islands of Adventure in 2002. In 2004, a dual-park format was tested, which opened parts of both parks. Since returning to Universal Studios Florida in 2006, the event has been held yearly, with the exception of 2020, when it was canceled due to the COVID-19 pandemic, making it the first year that Halloween Horror Nights was not held since its inception. The event later resumed with its 30th year in 2021.

History

The event was originally named Universal Studios Fright Nights in 1991 and began as a 3-night event at Universal Studios Florida on October 25, 26, and 31, 1991, with one haunted house, The Dungeon of Terror. From 1991 to 2001, the event was held at Universal Studios Florida.

The event was renamed Universal Studios Florida Halloween Horror Nights in 1992 and advertised as the second annual Halloween Horror Nights. There were two haunted houses, with The Dungeon of Terror returning and The People Under The Stairs making its debut in Soundstage 23. The event ran five nights, October 23–24, 29–31. In its third year, the event saw an increase to seven nights and the number of haunted houses increased to three, with the third at the Bates Motel film set.

For its fourth year, in 1994, Halloween Horror Nights expanded to an eight-night run with the return of a newly designed Dungeon of Terror haunted house, along with three more haunted houses. In addition to Nazarman's and the Bates Motel film set, the new locations were in the Earthquake overflow queue and the Boneyard. This year also marked the first use of the term "Scaracters", as well as the first official "Ghoul School" for actors participating in the event.
Ticket prices increased to $36 this year.

Halloween Horror Nights V featured a 12-night run and three haunted houses, one of which was a dual-path house. It was also the first time Universal themed the event around a character, in this case Tales from the Crypts Crypt Keeper. The event was subtitled "The Curse of the Crypt Keeper".

Universal Studios Hollywood had featured Halloween attractions in 1986 and 1992. Bearing little resemblance to the modern event, the 1986 effort was actually a tram tour, and was marred by the accidental death of a retail employee who, like many employees at the time, had volunteered to perform in the event. The 1992 event was a direct result of the success of Fright Nights at Universal Florida the year before, but was not successful. Halloween Horror Nights officially launched at Universal Studios Hollywood October 9, 1997, running through the 2000 season. From 2001 to 2005, Halloween Horror Nights went on hiatus at Universal Studios Hollywood, then returned in 2006. It has continued yearly since. Between 2007 and 2014, Universal Studios Hollywood made use of Universal's House of Horrors, its permanent haunted attraction, as a part of Halloween Horror Nights, by re-theming it for the event.

Back in Florida, Halloween Horror Nights VI through X followed the formula developed for Halloween Horror Nights V in 1995, growing from 15 nights in 1996 to 19 in 2000. There were three haunted houses each year, although from 1998 on, two each year were dual-path houses, for a total of five experiences. One notable change was the first 3-D haunted house, in 1999, in the Nazarman's facade. By 1999, ticket prices were $44. In 2000, Universal launched its first in-house created Icon, Jack the Clown.

Because the September 11 attacks occurred so close to Halloween Horror Nights XI, Universal made many changes to tone down the event. Much gore was scrapped from the event, and blood was replaced with green "goop". The names of several houses, scare zones, and shows were changed. The original icon character "Eddie" was scrapped. Edgar Sawyer was conceived as a demented, chainsaw-wielding horror movie buff that had been disfigured by a fire. He was supposed to be a threat to previous icon Jack and the tagline "No more clowning around" was used, and seen on early advertisements and merchandise. Eddie was ultimately removed from the event before it began, although he was still appearing on that year's logo and merchandise with the official "I.C.U." tagline. As a hurried replacement, Jack would return along with a line of merchandise bearing the tagline "Jack's Back." Eddie's back-story was changed, and his name was changed to Eddie Schmidt, Jack's younger brother. The event again ran for 19 days, admission was $48, with five haunted houses. The dual house was in Soundstage 22.

Halloween Horror Nights moved to Universal's Islands of Adventure in 2002. The Caretaker was not the original icon for Halloween Horror Nights 12 in 2002. Cindy (sometimes spelled "Sindy"), the daughter of mortuary owner Paul Bearer, was originally the icon of the event. In the event's premise, every land would be ruled over by her "playthings". After several child abductions in the area, the Cindy concept was abandoned and her father Paul Bearer changed into Dr. Albert Caine, also known as The Caretaker. Cindy would eventually appear in 2006's "Scream House Resurrection", 2009's "Shadows of the Past" and 2010's "The Orfanage: Ashes to Ashes". Halloween Horror Nights 12, the first to be held at Universal's Islands of Adventure park, featured five haunted houses, with admission set at $49.95.

Halloween Horror Nights 13 again took place at Islands of Adventure. It featured six haunted houses. The Icon was The Director.

For Halloween Horror Nights 14 in 2004 the resort experimented with a dual-park format, which connected and utilized parts of both parks. The fourteenth edition featured a mental patient. It ran 18 nights and featured seven haunted houses.

Halloween Horror Nights 15 in 2005 ran 19 nights, had seven haunted houses, and an admission of $59.75. This year was the first time an entire alternate reality (Terra Cruentus) was the basis for the entire event. Universal offered backstage tours of the Halloween Horror Nights sets.

In 2006, "Horror Comes Home" to the Universal Studios Florida park for its sweet 16 celebration with the four previous icons. Admission was $59.95. It ran 19 nights, featuring seven haunted houses.

For Halloween Horror Nights 17 in 2007, Universal Studios acquired the rights to use New Line Cinema's characters Freddy Krueger, Jason Voorhees, and Leatherface for Halloween Horror Nights. There were eight haunted houses. The event ran 23 days, with a ticket price of $64.95.

2008's Reflections of Fear featured a new icon in the form of Dr. Mary Agana, an original take on the Bloody Mary legend. The event revolved around the realm of reflections where Mary dwelled.

A musical tribute to The Rocky Horror Picture Show was added for the 18th and 19th installments.

2010 marked the 20th installment of the event at the Orlando park. It was titled "Twenty Years of Fear", and it featured Fear as the event's icon. There were eight haunted houses. The event ran 23 nights and admission was $74.99. 
 
2011 (Halloween Horror Nights 21) and 2012 (Halloween Horror Nights 22): eight and seven haunted houses, respectively; 25 nights and 22 nights, respectively; $81.99 and $88.99. "Roaming hordes" replace scare zones and The Walking Dead arrive as the event icon in 2012.

In 2011, Universal Studios Singapore began their Halloween Horror Nights event. There was one haunted house, the event ran seven nights, and admission was S$60.00. Universal Studios Singapore Halloween Horror Nights 2 in 2012, ran seven nights, had three haunted houses, with admission at S68.00. By 2015, Singapore's Halloween Horror Nights 5 had grown to four haunted houses, three of which were designed using local Singaporean horror legends and myths. Singapore's Halloween Horror Nights 6, in 2016, featured five haunted houses, ran 16 nights, with admission at S$69.00.

In 2012, Universal Studios Japan joined the Halloween Horror Nights franchise with an event themed to the Biohazard video games (known as Resident Evil in other countries). It ran 36 nights, from September 14 through November 11. Tickets were ¥8,400. By 2015, Universal Studios Japan had increased its "Universal Surprise Halloween at Universal Studios Japan" (which includes Halloween Horror Nights) to 59 days, featuring both daytime and nighttime activities.

2013 Florida's Halloween Horror Nights 23 featured a haunted house based on An American Werewolf in London, another based on The Cabin in the Woods, and a third based on Resident Evil, plus five more, for a total of eight. The Walking Dead continued as the event icon and The Rocky Horror Picture Show Tribute returned. It ran 27 nights. Admission was $91.99.

Florida's Halloween Horror Nights 24 in 2014 featured eight haunted houses and a return to the use of scare zones, absent since 2012. Universal again made use of licensed properties from others, including The Walking Dead, Alien vs. Predator, From Dusk till Dawn, Halloween, and The Purge. There were two shows, Bill and Ted and the Rocky Horror Tribute.

Halloween Horror Nights 25, in 2015 at Universal Studios Florida, brought back Jack the Clown as the icon along with his icon friends. HHN 25 ran a record 30 nights. HHN 25 featured nine haunted houses, with admission reaching $101.99 during the prime days.

Halloween Horror Nights 27 was the final year Bill & Ted's Excellent Halloween Adventure was performed at Universal Studios Florida. The show had been running at HHN since 1992.

Universal Studios Florida debuted a brand new lagoon show entitled "Halloween Marathon of Mayhem" during HHN 29 that featured "iconic scenes from well known and cult classic horror films and TV shows.

Universal Studios Hollywood included Throwback Thursdays as part of Halloween Horror Nights 2019. With a special welcome from Chucky and had Beetlejuice and a live DJ playing 1980s hits. Along with local Los Angeles 80s cover band, Fast Times, performing on select nights for the event.

Halloween Horror Nights 30 was initially planned for 2020, but it was cancelled and delayed to 2021 due to the COVID-19 pandemic's impact on theme parks. They later decided to feature two of the planned haunted houses as attractions for guests for the initially planned 2020 season. For the Halloween weekend of 2020, the originally planned Beetlejuice house was featured for a limited engagement.

In 2020, a limited-edition album, entitled Music of Halloween Horror Nights was made available at the Universal Studios Florida Halloween Horror Nights Tribute Store. The album featured songs created by Midnight Syndicate specifically for Halloween Horror Nights in addition to other tracks that had been used at the event and on the event's websites since 1999. The initial pressing sold out in less than a day. Subsequent pressings were made available at the event in 2021.

Event summaries

Universal Orlando Resort

Universal Studios Hollywood

Universal Studios Singapore

Universal Studios Japan

Event icons
Halloween Horror Nights has amassed a number of lead characters, known as icons. These icons usually have elaborate back-stories that involve the events' themes, houses, or scare zones. Predominantly, they have been used for promotional materials and merchandising. The first unofficial icon was The Crypt Keeper, from the TV series Tales from the Crypt, a series popular at the time of his first event appearance. The Crypt Keeper returned the next year for one of the houses, but was not featured in the advertising campaign. After the Crypt Keeper, the event continued for three years without an icon. In 1999, Imhotep served as Icon. for Halloween Horror Nights X, Jack the Clown was featured as an icon. This represents the first time Universal created an icon in-house.
Halloween Horror Nights has had an icon, and in some cases, multiple icons, every year since, excluding Halloween Horror Nights XIV, 
22-24 and 27-29. These characters have included Jack the Clown, The Caretaker, The Director, The Storyteller, Bloody Mary, The Usher, Fear, Lady Luck, Chance and The Pumpkin Lord. Chance was the icon for Halloween Horror Nights 2016. She was a new icon but used to serve as a "sidekick" to Jack (though there are rumours that they have a romantic relationship) in his shows (her role and look being inspired by Batman antagonist Harley Quinn). In 2007, for Halloween Horror Nights 17, Universal again licensed intellectual properties from others, in this case New Line Cinema for Freddy Krueger, Jason Voorhees, and Leatherface, however, Jack the Clown was still featured. Jack the Clown returned in 2015 for Halloween Horror Nights XXV followed by Chance in 2016 at Halloween Horror Nights 26. The icons returned in 2021 for HHN 30 in their house, Icons Captured. Set in Fear's Lantern from HHN 20, each had their own special room in the house where they re-enacted famous kills. The final room would feature a different icon who sat in the throne each night. At HHN 31, The Pumpkin Lord served as that year's icon after appearing at HHN 30 in The Wicked Growth: Realm of the Pumpkin house.

Attractions

Haunted houses
The haunted houses are the main attractions at the event. When the event first started as "Fright Nights" at Universal Studios Florida, there was simply one haunted house: the Dungeon of Terror. As the event progressed through the years, the number has increased to as many as ten different houses, as of Halloween Horror Nights 28 in 2018. The houses are enumerated in the expandable charts above for each park, sorted by year. The event typically averages nine haunted houses along with numerous scare zones.

Scare zones
Halloween Horror Nights IV was the first year to introduce a "scare zone", a name given to specific outdoor areas that feature costumed characters that fit the zone's theme with the intent of scaring people who walk through the areas. To get to certain areas of the park, it is necessary to travel through these scare zones. In 2012, Orlando re-envisioned the scare zones as "street experiences," claiming that scare actors were no longer restricted to specific "zones." Instead, there were a number of "hordes" which would change their location in the park every 90 minutes. By 2014, the traditional scare zones returned with The Purge: Anarchy (inspired by the film), Face Off: In the Flesh, Bayou of Blood, and MASKerade: Unstitched. However, Hollywood Horror Nights in California still has specific scare zones, that range in themes. In recent years, Halloween Horror Nights in Orlando has adjusted the locations of its scare zones, forcing attendees to walk through at least one zone when entering the park. While actors cannot touch guests and vice versa, many of them can surround them at one time. Many actors in these areas have props like bats, chainsaws, and fake guns, and can act like they are going to attack guests with their "weapons". Actors are also allowed to chase visitors in and out of the scare zones. From time to time, actors will pose as regular event guests, only to be captured by various hordes, specifically The Purge.

Entertainment/Shows
Halloween Horror Nights has featured several live entertainment shows. Recurring shows have included "The Rocky Horror Picture Show A Tribute", "Bill and Ted's Excellent Halloween Adventure", Robosaurus and Academy of Villains. Bill and Ted's show appeared in every Halloween Horror Nights from 1992 until its closure following Halloween Horror Nights 27 in 2017.

It was "...a scatter-shot mashup of pop culture, popular radio and unexpectedly mature content" according to a review.

For the first time, Universal Studios Florida will debut a brand new lagoon show entitled "Halloween Marathon of Mayhem" during HHN 29 that will feature "iconic scenes from top horror films, cult classics and TV shows.

Rides
Several theme park rides remain operational during the event. In past event years, some were re-themed for the event such as Kongfrontation becoming Tramway of Doom during Halloween Horror Nights II. Diagon Alley has been open for Halloween Horror Nights since 2015. It was closed-off in 2014 despite opening just a few months earlier and to date it has not been re-themed or had any scare actors present.

Commercials, media, and awards
Universal's Halloween Horror Nights is known for the dark tone of its advertisements and commercials. A majority of them were directed by Dean Kane. In 2010, the directors of Daybreakers, Michael Spierig and Peter Spierig, directed the commercial for Halloween Horror Nights.

Universal Studios Florida has won Amusement Todays Golden Ticket Award for Best Halloween Event 12 of the 14 times it has been awarded, including the last eleven years straight.

COVID-19 pandemic impact
Due to COVID-19 and its spread to Florida and to California, Universal Orlando announced Halloween Horror Nights' 30th annual event would not be taking place in 2020 as originally planned in Orlando or Hollywood. In a statement "Universal Orlando Resort will be focusing exclusively on operating its theme parks for daytime guests, using the enhanced health and safety procedures already in place," the resort said in a news release Friday morning. "We know this decision will disappoint our fans and guests. We are disappointed, too. But we look forward to creating an amazing event in 2021." However, Universal opted to open the Halloween Horror Nights merchandise store. Universal Orlando did open two haunted houses in the fall of 2020, the "Bride of Frankenstein Lives" house and the "Revenge of the Tooth Fairy" house, in an attempt to lure back park guests but under full COVID restrictions with only three guests per room and distanced accordingly. This was not considered as a true Halloween event as the company simply was testing the procedure for Halloween events as precautions. These houses lasted throughout the season. A third house, based on the film Beetlejuice, opened Halloween weekend. All three were closed November 1.

On September 9, Universal Singapore announced that they made a decision to not hold the event that year.

Incident
 On October 31, 1986, during the "Fright Nights" event, scare actor Paul Rebalde Brooks, who was supposed to scare the attendees at The Terror Tram (a nighttime version of the Backlot Tour), fell between two of the tram cars and was crushed to death by a tram. Universal Studios Hollywood put Halloween events on hiatus until six years later, when their "Halloween Horror Nights" debuted in 1992.
 On October 28, 2015, two guests were arrested and charged with battery for attacking "scare actors" during the Halloween Horror Nights event. At least two scare actors quit after the attacks.

References

Halloween Horror Nights Universal Orlando Resort
Halloween Horror Nights Universal Studios Hollywood
Halloween Horror Nights Universal Studios Singapore
Universal Studios Hollywood
Universal Studios Florida
Universal Studios Singapore
Universal Studios Japan
Islands of Adventure
Universal Parks & Resorts attractions by name
Halloween events in the United States
Haunted attractions (simulated)
1991 establishments in Florida